Leonard E. Cave (October 22, 1944 – June 11, 2006) was an American sculptor who worked in the Washington metropolitan area. Cave exhibited his works in solo and group exhibitions mainly within the United States and Japan. He primarily worked with wood, carving large sculptural and abstract pieces, though he also worked with other materials, such as metal. In 1984, Cave founded the Washington Sculptors Group in Washington, D.C. He presided over this group for several years, though he was also a professor at Georgetown University and a public school teacher. He died in 2006 after sustaining fatal injuries from a car accident involving a drunk driver.

Biography

Early life

Leonard Cave was born on October 22, 1944 to Cecil Reginald and Lila Mae Cave, the third of four brothers, Cecil, Blanchard, and the youngest, Phillip.  He was born in Columbia, South Carolina, but spent his childhood in Orangeburg. When Cave was young, his father died. Throughout his childhood, he had undiagnosed Tourette's syndrome.

Education 

After high school, Cave enrolled in Furman University on a pole-vaulting scholarship.  During one competition, Cave sustained a back injury. While he was recovering, he devoted his time to sculpture. Eventually Cave transferred schools, going on to develop his skills as a sculptor and earn a master's degree in Fine Art from the University of Maryland.  It was there that he studied under the sculptor Ken Campbell, by whom he was greatly influenced.

After completing his graduate coursework, Cave taught at Georgetown University for seven years. In 1986 he left his position at Georgetown University to teach briefly at the Torpedo Factory. For twenty years he taught at public schools in Montgomery County where he taught ceramics, sculpture and digital art. Additionally, he was instrumental in establishing an Academy of Commercial and Fine Art for the Montgomery County School District. At the time of his death, Cave was working for Northwest High School in Germantown, MD.

Washington Sculptors Group 

In 1984, Cave was a founding member of the Washington Sculptors Group (WSG). Cave was elected the WSG's President and oversaw the formation of the organization. He helped draft its first constitution and by-laws, insured its non-profit status, organized the first Board, and located sites for shows. In addition, he worked with the National Park Service to host the first symposium on wood sculpture that took place in accordance with WSG. His mission was to push sculpture into the foreground of DC art (which was otherwise considered a "painter's town") and to foster an exchange of ideas among sculptors, collectors, and the public.

Death

Cave died on July 11, 2006 in a head-on collision with a drunk driver. The collision occurred in Frederick County, MD. The surviving passenger in the car was Carolyn Gipe, a fellow teacher and his fiancée.

Three years after his death, Northwest High School dedicated the new art wing to him. The Leonard E. Cave Memorial Arts Wing holds a sculpture by the artist as well as a mural depicting his likeness.

Personal life

Cave was formerly married to Sandi Cave, but at the time of his death he was engaged to be married to a co-worker. He was a member of Cedarbrook Community Church in Clarksburg, Maryland.

Artwork 

According to Cave's elder brother, much of Cave's work went to Furnam University upon his death. A large collection of his work was given to Hillyer Art Space in Washington, D.C, whose parent organization is International Arts & Artists. Duncan Tebow, former president of WSG and board member of IA&A, was a close personal friend of Cave's. Several of Cave's works that have been hosted on Hillyer Art Space's big cartel have been put up for auction and successfully sold.

Solo exhibitions

Group exhibitions

Craft-related exhibitions

Collections
 Allegheny College, Meadeville, PA
Bank of Dallas, Dallas, TX
City of West Hollywood, CA
Columbia Museum of Art, Columbia, SC
Department of State, Washington, DC
Furman University, Greenville, SC
Herbert F. Johnson Museum of Art, Cornell University, Ithaca, NY
IP Stanback Museum and Planetarium, Orangeburg, SC
Mintz, Levin, Washington, DC
Oliver Carr Company, Washington, DC
Silas Mountsier, Nutley, New Jersey
South Carolina State Museum
South Carolina State University
The White House, Washington, DC
University of Maryland, College Park, MD

Awards

References

Artists from Washington, D.C.
1944 births
Sculptors from South Carolina
2006 deaths
20th-century American sculptors
American male sculptors
20th-century American male artists